See You Next Tuesday is the second and final studio album by FannyPack. It was released on May 10, 2005 under Tommy Boy Records. The album's hits were "Nu Nu (Yeah Yeah)," "Fire Fire," and "On My Lap."

Track listing

References

External links
 

2005 albums
FannyPack albums
Tommy Boy Records albums